Volk Meditsch was a politician in Slovenia during the early 16th century when it was under the Holy Roman Empire. He became mayor of Ljubljana in 1511.
He was succeeded by Matevz Frang in 1513.

References

Mayors of places in the Holy Roman Empire
Mayors of Ljubljana
Year of birth missing
Year of death missing
16th-century Slovenian people